The Minister for the Cabinet Office is a position in the Cabinet Office of the United Kingdom. The minister is responsible for the work and policies of the Cabinet Office, and since February 2022, reports to the Chancellor of the Duchy of Lancaster. The position is currently the third highest ranking minister in the Cabinet Office, after the Prime Minister and the Chancellor of the Duchy of Lancaster.

From the Second May ministry until mid-2019 when the First Johnson ministry came to power, it functioned as an alternative title to Deputy Prime Minister or First Secretary of State. This practice ended when Dominic Raab was appointed as First Secretary of State on 24 July 2019, by Boris Johnson. Since a reshuffle in February 2022, the role attends Cabinet but not as a full member.

The corresponding Shadow Minister is the Shadow Minister for the Cabinet Office.

Function and status
The Cabinet Office has a primary responsibility to support the work of the Prime Minister and ensure the effective running of government. Within this set-up, the Minister for the Cabinet Office has been seen to have varying responsibilities and stature in the government. The role is a flexible one and has variously been described as one or several of the following under different office-holders (and sometimes conflicting accounts of the status of the same office holder):

 Monitoring the co-ordination of the work of government departments
 Chairing or sitting on several Cabinet Committees
 An additional title to indicate special responsibility
 An additional title to indicate seniority

The government describes the minister for the Cabinet Office as being "in overall charge of and responsible for the policy and work of the department, and attends Cabinet".

Damian Green held the office in 2017, simultaneously with the office of First Secretary of State. Green chaired numerous Cabinet Committees and filled in for the Prime Minister at Prime Minister's Questions. By virtue of his responsibilities and as First Secretary of State, he was considered the de facto Deputy Prime Minister. Upon the appointment of David Lidington in 2018, Lidington retained the responsibilities Green had held, but the title of First Secretary of State remained vacant (as did the office of Deputy Prime Minister, vacant since 2015).

As a result, the office in its 2017–2019 absorbed the responsibilities of a de facto Deputy Prime Minister, without either of the associated titles usually granted to individuals in the British Government (First Secretary of State or Deputy Prime Minister). In 2019, new Prime Minister Boris Johnson ended this arrangement with the appointment of a new First Secretary of State, Dominic Raab, before upgrading his title again to Deputy Prime Minister in 2021.

Current minister and responsibilities
Jeremy Quin has served as the Minister for the Cabinet Office since 25th October 2022. He also serves as Paymaster General alongside his position. 

The most recent responsibilities are:
Oversight of all Cabinet Office policy and appointments
Oversight of transition period activity and the United Kingdom's future relations with the EU
Oversight of constitutional policy and enhancement, defending democracy and electoral law
Devolution issues and Strengthening the Union
Leading cross-government and public sector transformation and efficiency
Oversight of cross-government work on veterans’ issues
Oversight of Cabinet Office responsibilities on National Security and resilience, and the Civil Contingencies Secretariat, including COVID-19
Supporting the coordination of the cross-government and the devolution aspects of the response to COVID-19

Ministers for the Cabinet Office
Every occupant of the position has simultaneously held a sinecure office, this being Chancellor of the Duchy of Lancaster from Clark to Byrne, Paymaster General from Jowell to Gummer, and First Secretary of State with Green. Oliver Dowden, and currently Edward Argar and his preceder Michael Ellis, held the office of Paymaster General, while David Lidington, Michael Gove and Steve Barclay held the role of Chancellor of the Duchy of Lancaster.

Ministers of State at the Cabinet Office
Minister of State for the Cabinet Office 

 1997: Derek Foster
 1997-1999: Peter Kilfoyle
 1998-2001: The Lord Falconer of Thoroton
 1999-2001: Ian McCartney
 2001: The Baroness Morgan of Huyton
 2001-2002: Barbara Roche
 2002-2003: Douglas Alexander
 2004-2005: David Miliband
Minister Assisting the Deputy Prime Minister

 2012-2015: David Laws

Minister of State at the Cabinet Office

 2020-2022: The Lord True
 2021-2022: Alok Sharma (President for COP26)
 2021: The Lord Frost (Minister of State for EU Relations)
 2022-present: The Baroness Neville-Rolfe

Notes

References

External links

 Cabinet Office

Cabinet Office (United Kingdom)
Ministerial offices in the United Kingdom
1997 establishments in the United Kingdom